Simon Kelway (died 1623), of Dawlish, Devon, was an English politician.

He was a Member (MP) of the Parliament of England for Totnes in 1589. His family were related to the Courtenay family.

References

16th-century births
1623 deaths
English MPs 1589
People from Dawlish
Members of the Parliament of England (pre-1707) for Totnes